This is a list of heli-skiing operators. These are companies that provide heli-skiing and/or heli-snowboarding services in the Canadian province of British Columbia.

Bearpaw Heli
Bella Coola Heli Sports
CMH Heli-Skiing & Summer Adventures
Crescent Spur Heli
Eagle Pass Heli
Great Canadian Heliskiing
James Orr Heliski
Kingfisher Heli
Last Frontier Heliskiing
Mica Heliskiing Guides
Mike Wiegele Helicopter Skiing
Northern Escape Heli-skiing
Powder Mountain Whistler
Purcell Heli
RK Heliski
Selkirk Tangiers Heli
Silvertip Lodge Heli
Skeena Heli
Snowwater Heli
Stellar Heliskiing
Tyax Lodge & Heliskiing 
Whistler Heli
White Wilderness Heli

See also
List of ski areas and resorts in Canada#British Columbia

References

Operators
Skiing-related lists